Ngatjan is a locality split between the Cassowary Coast Region and the Cairns Region, Queensland, Australia. The term is derived from the ethnonym of the local Ngatjan people.

Geography 
The split between the local government areas approximates the drainage divide with the northern part of the locality in the Cairns Region draining into the Russell River (Suez Creek being the principal watercourse within the northern part of the locality) and with the southern part of the locality in the Cassowary Coast Region draining into the North Johnstone River (Waraker Creek being the principal watercourse within the southern part of the locality).

The locality is mountainous terrain ranging from 20 metres above sea level (in the Suez Creek valley) through to peaks such as Mount Mirinjo (390 metres), Cooroo Peak (430 metres) and Chalmynia Mountain (400 metres). The land in the locality is undeveloped and entirely contained within the Wooroonooran National Park (part of the Wet Tropics World Heritage Area).

The only road through Ngatjan is the Cooroo Lands Road which traverses the southern part of the locality connecting the locality of Cooroo Lands (which is cut off to the south by the Johnstone River) to Upper Darradgee from where there are connections through to the Bruce Highway at Fitzgerald Creek.

References

External links 

Cassowary Coast Region
Cairns Region
Localities in Queensland